was a Japanese video game developer and publisher based out of Osaka, it was one of the developer companies of SNK, established by former Atlus staff members who previously worked on Princess Crown for Sega Saturn. Its more known games were Gaia Crusaders, Sengoku 3 and the new games of Rage of the Dragons & Power Instinct (having the rights of Evoga and Atlus to continue developing the series).

Software

Video games

Others
Desktop Mascot Shakugan no Shana

Notes

References

External links
 Noise Factory Official Website

SNK
SNK Playmore
Defunct video game companies of Japan
Video game companies established in 1998